The Tikunani Prism is a clay artifact with an Akkadian cuneiform inscription listing the names of 438 Habiru soldiers of King Tunip-Teššup of Tikunani (a small North Mesopotamian kingdom).  This king was a contemporary of King Hattusili I of the Hittites (around 1550 BC).

The discovery of this text generated much excitement, for it provided much-needed fresh evidence about the nature of the Habiru (or Hapiru) and their possible connection to the Biblical Hebrews. However, the majority of Tunip-Tessup's Habiru soldiers recorded in the text had Hurrian names that could not be explained in any Canaanite language (the family which Hebrew belongs to) or any other Semitic language. The rest of the names are Semitic, except for one Kassite name.  

The Prism is 8½ inches tall, with a square base roughly 2 by 2 inches.  It is held in a private collection of antiquities in England, and its provenance is unknown.

External links
Image of the Tikukani prism  from Archaeological Odyssey archived at coupdefoudre.com. Accessed on 2017-10-12.
Tribes and Territories in transition (PDF; the link doesn't work yet you can find the book on BnB, Amazon etc.)
"Wer findet Abraham?" (German)

References
 Mirjo Salvini, The Habiru prism of King Tunip-Teššup of Tikunani. Documenta Asiana, vol. 3. Istituti Editoriali e Poligrafici Internazionali, Rome (1996). 129 pages, 55 figures, including complete images of the prism. .  Reviewed by R. D. Biggs.
 Thomas Richter, Anmerkungen zu den hurritischer Personennamen der hapiru-Prismas aus Tigunana. In General |Studies and Excavations at Nuzi, vol. 10/2, Studies on the Civilization and Culture of nuzi and the Hurrians, vol. 9. pages 125-134. Bethseda, Maryland (1998). Cited by R. D. Biggs.

16th-century BC works
Habiru
Akkadian literature
Akkadian inscriptions
Ancient Near and Middle East clay objects